Élodie Mendy (born 28 November 1994 in Évreux) is a French basketball player who plays for club Arras of the Ligue Féminine de Basketball, women's basketball league in France. She is 5'4" (1.63 m) tall.

References

French women's basketball players
1994 births
Living people
Sportspeople from Évreux